Moving Targets is the debut studio album by English band Penetration, released in 1978 by record label Virgin.

Reception 

AllMusic wrote: "Penetration's debut album stands among the very last true greats of the first wave of British punk offerings." Trouser Press wrote: "Penetration's debut LP mixes expansive creations and direct punk-outs, all done with flair and originality. Unlike other LPs by young bands of this era, Moving Targets still sounds surprisingly fresh."

Track listing
"Future Daze" (Neale Floyd, Pauline Murray) - 2:58
"Life's a Gamble" (Pauline Murray, Gary Chaplin) - 2:59
"Lovers of Outrage" (Pauline Murray, Gary Chaplin) - 3:56
"Vision" (Robert Blamire, Pauline Murray) - 3:24
"Silent Community" (Pauline Murray, Gary Chaplin) - 3:29
"Stone Heroes" (Neale Floyd, Pauline Murray, Robert Blamire) - 3:15
"Movement" (Robert Blamire, Pauline Murray) - 3:22
"Too Many Friends" (Robert Blamire, Pauline Murray, Fred Purser) - 3:13
"Reunion" (Neale Floyd, Pauline Murray) - 3:59
"Nostalgia" (Pete Shelley) - 3:49
"Freemoney" (Patti Smith, Lenny Kaye) - 4:48

Personnel
Penetration 
Pauline Murray - vocals
Gary Chaplin - guitar
Fred Purser - lead guitar; keyboards on "Reunion"
Neale Floyd - guitar
Robert Blamire - bass
Gary Smallman - drums, percussion
Technical
Mick Glossop - engineer
Robert Mason, Russell Mills - sleeve artwork
Paul Nugent - sleeve photography

References

External links 

 

1978 debut albums
Albums produced by Mike Howlett
Virgin Records albums